In mathematics, in the area of functional analysis and operator theory, the Volterra operator, named after Vito Volterra, is a bounded linear operator on the space L2[0,1] of complex-valued square-integrable functions on the interval [0,1]. On the subspace C[0,1] of continuous functions it represents indefinite integration. It is the operator corresponding to the Volterra integral equations.

Definition
The Volterra operator, V, may be defined for a function f ∈ L2[0,1] and a value t ∈ [0,1], as

Properties
V is a bounded linear operator between Hilbert spaces, with Hermitian adjoint 
V is a Hilbert–Schmidt operator, hence in particular is compact.
V has no eigenvalues and therefore, by the spectral theory of compact operators, its spectrum σ(V) = {0}.
V is a quasinilpotent operator (that is, the spectral radius, ρ(V), is zero), but it is not nilpotent.
The operator norm of V is exactly ||V|| = 2⁄π.

References

Further reading

Operator theory